SBS Bank is a registered bank in New Zealand which was founded in 1869. In October 2008 it gained bank registration and the Southland Building Society became SBS Bank. It is a 100% New Zealand owned registered bank that has retained a mutual building society structure. It uses the prefix 03 for its account numbers which is the same as Westpac Bank NZ because they use the same 'lines'. The bank's head office is based in Invercargill.

History 
Initially, when founded in 1869, SBS Bank was called Southland Building, Land and Investment Society but was renamed as Southland Building and Investment Society and Bank of Deposit in 1876. For the first 30 years, James Walker Bain was the society's president. The name of the bank officially changed to SBS Bank in 1995. In 2010 Hastings Building Society joined with SBS Bank and in November 2015 HBS Bank amalgamated with SBS Bank.

References 

Building societies of New Zealand
Banks established in 1869
Banks of New Zealand
Companies based in Invercargill